San Michele di Ganzaria (Sicilian: San Micheli di Ganzarìa ) is a comune (municipality) in the Metropolitan City of Catania in the Italian region Sicily, located about  southeast of Palermo and about  southwest of Catania. The town was settled and historically inhabited by the Arbëreshë community. 

San Michele di Ganzaria borders the following municipalities: Caltagirone, Mazzarino, Piazza Armerina, San Cono.

References

External links
 Official website

Arbëresh settlements

Cities and towns in Sicily